Seligman High School is a high school in Seligman, Arizona. It is the only high school in the Seligman Unified School District, which also includes an elementary school. Schools in the district operate on a four-day school week.

Since 2008 Peach Springs Unified School District of Peach Springs sends its high school students to other districts, one of them Seligman USD. Previously Peach Springs operated its own high school, Music Mountain Junior/Senior High School.

References

Public high schools in Arizona
Schools in Yavapai County, Arizona